Zannone is an island in the Tyrrhenian Sea off the west coast of Italy, and is part of the Pontine Islands, administratively in the comune of Ponza.

It is part of the Circeo National Park because of its beauty and several rare biomes. The island is uninhabited but supervised by the Forestry Service, which maintains a station and small educational exhibit on top of Monte Pellegrino, the highest point on the island. There are also ruins of a Benedictine convent dating to the 13th century. Built on top of this former convent are the remains of a Colonial style villa once the home of Marquis Casati Stampa and his wife Anna Fallarino, who hosted orgies on the island. No special permit is required to visit the island, but Zannone has no tourist facilities and camping or overnight stays by the general public are prohibited, though biologists, scientists and birdwatchers have been granted permission to camp overnight on the island.

Zannone is accessible only by boat from Ponza.

The island had been used as a private hunting reserve by Italian aristocracy. Hundreds of mouflon wild sheep were brought on to Zannone. The mouflons are now an invasive species, threatening native flora on the island through over-grazing.

Punta Varo Lighthouse
There is a lighthouse on the island called Punta Varo Lighthouse.

See also
 List of islands of Italy

References

External links

Circeo National Park
Images

Islands of Lazio
Uninhabited islands of Italy